Jadine Nollan (born September 29, 1958) is an American politician who served in the Oklahoma House of Representatives from the 66th district from 2010 to 2022. She will retire from office after the 2022 elections due to term limits.

References

1958 births
Living people
Republican Party members of the Oklahoma House of Representatives
People from Sand Springs, Oklahoma
21st-century American politicians
21st-century American women politicians
Women state legislators in Oklahoma